Grimstad Township is a township in Roseau County, Minnesota, United States. The population was 190 at the 2000 census.

Grimstad Township bears the name of John Grimstad, a Norwegian settler.

Geography

Demographics
As of the census of 2000, there were 190 people, 76 households, and 58 families residing in the township.  The population density was 5.1 people per square mile (2.0/km2).  There were 89 housing units at an average density of 2.4/sq mi (0.9/km2).  The racial makeup of the township was 100.00% White.

There were 76 households, out of which 31.6% had children under the age of 18 living with them, 67.1% were married couples living together, 3.9% had a female householder with no husband present, and 22.4% were non-families. 21.1% of all households were made up of individuals, and 5.3% had someone living alone who was 65 years of age or older.  The average household size was 2.50 and the average family size was 2.86.

In the township the population was spread out, with 27.4% under the age of 18, 4.7% from 18 to 24, 30.0% from 25 to 44, 22.1% from 45 to 64, and 15.8% who were 65 years of age or older.  The median age was 36 years. For every 100 females, there were 126.2 males.  For every 100 females age 18 and over, there were 122.6 males.

The median income for a household in the township was $42,500, and the median income for a family was $42,917. Males had a median income of $31,607 versus $27,813 for females. The per capita income for the township was $15,762.  About 7.4% of families and 5.2% of the population were below the poverty line, including none of those under the age of eighteen and 4.5% of those 65 or over.

References

Townships in Roseau County, Minnesota
Townships in Minnesota